Jan Hernych was the defending champion but lost in the second round to Pierre-Hugues Herbert.
Adrian Mannarino defeated Dustin Brown 7–6(7–3), 7–6(7–2) in the final to win the title.

Seeds

Draw

Finals

Top half

Bottom half

References

 Main Draw
 Qualifying Draw

BH Telecom Indoors - Singles
2013 Singles